Toyama Seibu Sports Center is an arena in Tonami, Toyama, Japan.

Facilities
Large arena - 50m×40m 2,000m2
Medium arena - 34m×29m 986m2
No. 1 Training room - 303m2
No. 2 Training room - 121m2
Sauna

References

External links
Toyama Seibu Sports Centre

Basketball venues in Japan
Indoor arenas in Japan
Sports venues in Toyama Prefecture
Swimming venues in Japan
Toyama Grouses
Toyama (city)
Sports venues completed in 1999
1999 establishments in Japan